Al Fallah al Fasih ( translit. Al-Fallah al-Fasih) The Eloquent Peasant is a 1970 Egyptian short film, based on the tale of The Eloquent Peasant dates to the Middle Kingdom (c. 2040 – 1782 BCE).

It has been presented for the first time at the 31st Venice International Film Festival. It is a short film written and directed by Shadi Abdel Salam.

Plot
The peasant Khun-anup tricked by the unscrupulous Nemtynakht, is forced to rely on his own eloquence to convince lord Rensi's lands about his needs of justice.

Cast
Ahmed Marei as Khun-anup.
Anan Ahmed as Rensi.
Ahmad Hegazi as Nemtynakht.

Bibliography

See also 
 Egyptian films of the 1970s
 List of Egyptian films of 1970

References

External links
(EN) "El-Fallâh el-fasîh":
(AR) "The Eloquent Peasant Shadi Abdel Salam" (1970):

Egyptian short films
1970 films
1970s Arabic-language films